(anglicised as Hegura or Hekura) is a small island located in the Sea of Japan at the far north of Ishikawa Prefecture, Japan. It lies approximately 47 km from the northern tip of Noto Peninsula., and is administratively part of Amamachi township within the city of Wajima. Hegurajima (literally helm-storehouse island) is approximately 2 km by 1 km in size and can easily be walked around in less than an hour.

The island is made of andesite, with steep cliffs on its northern side, and a sandy beach on it southern side, which is used as a shelter by fishermen. The island had a population of 164 in the year 2000 census, which dropped to 110 people in the 2010 census; however, the actual number of full-time residents is considerably less.

It is thought that Hegurajima corresponds to the island called Neko-no-Shima (Isle of the Cat) in a tale found in Konjaku Monogatari, an early 13th-century folktale collection.

Notable facts
There is a lighthouse in the center of the island and a small minshuku. During the summer months female ama divers dive for abalone, Turbo cornutus and Gelidiaceae  for about 4–5 hours per day, following a long tradition that predates the use of wetsuits. There is a small fishing port, and a ferry runs to Wajima on the mainland. The island is a haven for migratory birds, and attracts tourists for birdwatching.

Climate

References

Further reading

External links 

 Island school website in Japanese
 Ferry Company "Hegura Kōro" in Japanese

Islands of Ishikawa Prefecture
Islands of the Sea of Japan
Wajima, Ishikawa